Utkantheshwar Mahadev is a Shiva Temple in the Kapadvanj Taluka, Kheda district of Gujarat, India. and is located on the bank of Vatrak river.

References 

Kheda district
Shiva temples in Gujarat